Caesar Ridge FC is a Belizean football team which currently competes in the FFB Top League. The team have previously competed in amateur level competitions in the country, and are based in Belize City.

References

Football clubs in Belize